US de la Comoé is a Burkinabé football club based in Banfora. They play their home games at the Stade Banfora. The club's colors are blue and yellow.

Achievements
Burkinabé Second League: 1
 2001

External links
Team profile – soccerway.com

Football clubs in Burkina Faso
Association football clubs established in 1985
Cascades Region
1985 establishments in Burkina Faso